The IV Central American Games (Spanish: IV Juegos Deportivos Centroamericanos) was a multi-sport event that took place between 5–14 January 1990.  The games were officially opened by Honduran president José Azcona.  Torch lighter was Zacarías Arzú, who represented Honduras internationally in both baseball and football.

Participation
The Games saw the first appearance of athletes from Belize.  Panamá did not participate because of the recent political and military incidents. Therefore, athletes from only 6 countries were reported to participate:

 (139)
 (290)
 (368)
 (457)
 (487)
 (373)

The 1990 Central American and Caribbean Games in Mexico were staged in November and December 1990.

Sports
The competition featured 23 disciplines from 22 sports (plus bodybuilding as exhibition).

Aquatic sports
 Swimming
 Water polo
 Athletics
 Baseball
 Basketball
 Bodybuilding†
 Bowling
 Boxing
 Chess
 Cycling
 Equestrian
 Fencing
 Football
 Gymnastics
 Judo
 Racquetball
 Shooting
 Softball
 Table tennis
 Taekwondo
 Tennis
 Volleyball
 Weightlifting
 Wrestling

†: Exhibition event

Medal table 
The table below is taken from El Diario de Hoy, San Salvador, El Salvador, and from El Nuevo Diario, Managua, Nicaragua.

External links
 MásGoles webpage

References 

Central American Games
Central American Games
International sports competitions hosted by Honduras
Central American Games
Cent
Multi-sport events in Honduras